The Speaker for the House of Assembly of Nova Scotia is the presiding Officer of the House of Assembly. Keith Bain is the current Speaker of the 64th General Assembly of Nova Scotia.

The Speaker presides over the proceedings of the Assembly, maintains order, regulates debate in accordance with the rules and practices of the House, and ensures that all viewpoints have the opportunity of a hearing.

The Speaker does not take part in the debates of the Assembly and only takes part in a vote to cast the deciding vote in the event of a tie. He is the guardian of the privileges of the Assembly and protects the rights of its Members.

The Speaker is the only representative of the House of Assembly.  The Speaker has jurisdiction and day to day control over all matters concerning Province House, including operations, maintenance and restoration, and administration of the adjacent office complexes at One Government Place, the George Building, and the Provincial Building.  The Speaker is the Chair of the Legislature Internal Economy Board, the body responsible for regulating services to Members.

In the House, Speaker decides questions of order and rules on questions of privilege after allowing appropriate debate. Decisions of the Speaker are not debatable or subject to appeal except by a substantive motion after proper notice has been given.

Speakers of the House of Assembly
Robert Sanderson (1758–1759)
William Nesbitt (1759–1784)
Thomas Cochran (1784–1785)
Sampson Salter Blowers (1785–1789)
Richard John Uniacke (1789–1793)
Thomas Henry Barclay (1793–1799)
Richard John Uniacke (1799–1805) 2nd time
William Cottnam Tonge (1805–1806)
Morris Wilkins, Conservative, (1806–1818) 
Simon Bradstreet Robie, Conservative, (1818–1824)  
Samuel George William Archibald, Reformer, (1824–1840)
Joseph Howe, Reformer, (1840–1843)
William Young, Reformer, (1843–1855)
Stewart Campbell, Liberal, (1855–1863)
John Chipman Wade, Conservative, (1863–1867)
John Joseph Marshall, Conservative, (1867–1870)
Jared C. Troop, Reformer, Anti-Confederate, (1870–1874)
John Barnhill Dickie, Liberal, (1874–1875)
Mather Byles DesBrisay, Liberal, (1875–1876)
Isaac N. Mack, Liberal, (1877–1878)
Ebenezer Tilton Moseley, Liberal-Conservative, (1878–1882)
Angus McGillivray, Liberal, (1882–1886)
Michael Joseph Power, Liberal, (1886–1894)
Frederick Andrew Laurence, Liberal, (1894–1901)
Thomas Robertson, Liberal, (1902–1903)
Frederick Andrew Laurence, Liberal, (1903–1904)
Edward Matthew Farrell, Liberal, (1905–1910)
George Everett Faulkner, Liberal, (February 24, 1910 – May 15, 1911)
James F. Ellis, Liberal, (1911–1917)
Robert Irwin, Liberal, (1917–1925)
Albert Parsons, Liberal-Conservative, (1926–1928)
Daniel George McKenzie, Liberal-Conservative, (1929–1933)
Lindsay C. Gardner, Liberal, (1934–1938)
Moses Elijah McGarry, Liberal, (1939–1940)
Gordon E. Romkey, Liberal, (1940–1953)
John Smith MacIvor, Liberal, (1954–1956)
W. S. Kennedy Jones, Progressive Conservative, (1957–1960)
Harvey Veniot, Progressive Conservative, (1961–1968)
G. H. (Paddy) Fitzgerald, Progressive Conservative, (1969–1970)
George M. Mitchell, Liberal, (1970–1973)
James L. Connolly, Liberal, (1973–1974)
Vincent MacLean, Liberal, (1974–1976)
George Doucet, Liberal, (1977–1978)
Ronald Russell (1978–1980), Progressive Conservative, 1st time
Arthur R. Donahoe, Progressive Conservative, (1981–1991)
Ronald Russell, Progressive Conservative, (1991–1993) 2nd time
Paul MacEwan, Liberal, (1993–1996)
Wayne Gaudet, Liberal, (1996–1997)
Gerry Fogarty, Liberal, (1997–1998)
Ronald Russell, Progressive Conservative, (1998–1999) 3rd time
Murray Scott, Progressive Conservative, (1999–2006)
Cecil Clarke, Progressive Conservative, (2006–2007)
Alfie MacLeod, Progressive Conservative, (2007–2009)
Charlie Parker, New Democratic Party, (2009–2011)
Gordie Gosse, New Democratic Party, (2011–2013)
Kevin Murphy, Liberal, (2013-2021)
Keith Bain, Progressive Conservative (2021-)

External links
 House of Assembly Official Site

Nova Scotia
Politics of Nova Scotia